Gellu Naum (1 August 1915 – 29 September 2001) was a Romanian poet, dramatist, novelist, children's writer, and translator. He is remembered as the founder of the Romanian Surrealist group. The artist Lygia Naum, his wife, was the inspiration and main character in his 1985 novel Zenobia.

Biography
Born in Bucharest, he was the son of the poet  (who had been drafted in World War I and died during the Battle of Mărăşeşti) and his wife Maria Naum née Rosa Gluck. In 1933, he began studying philosophy at the University of Bucharest. In 1938, he left for France, where he continued his studies at the University of Paris. He took his PhD diploma with a thesis on the scholastic philosopher Pierre Abelard.

In 1936 (the year when he published his first book), Naum met Victor Brauner, who became his close friend and who later introduced him to André Breton and his Surrealist circle in Paris.

In 1941, he helped create the Bucharest group of Surrealists (which also included Gherasim Luca, Paul Păun, Dolfi Trost, and ). Naum was drafted into Romanian Army during World War II and served on the Eastern Front after the invasion of the Soviet Union (see Romania during World War II). Marked by his wartime experience, he was discharged in 1944, after he had fallen ill.

In December 1947, the Surrealist group succumbed to the vicissitudes of postwar Soviet occupation and successful Communist takeover of Romania's government. As Socialist realism had officially become Romania's cultural policy, he could only publish books for children (out of which the two books with Apolodor were reissued several times). Although he published several books in the line of Socialist realism, which he reneged on afterwards, he never stopped writing Surrealist poems, such as the 1958 poem composed of several parts Heraclitus (published in the 1968 volume Athanor) or the esoteric manuscript The Way of the Snake, written in 1948–1949 and published after his death, in 2002.

Between 1950 and 1953, he taught philosophy at the Agronomic Institute in Bucharest while working also as a translator. He translated works by Samuel Beckett, René Char, Denis Diderot, Alexandre Dumas, père, Julien Gracq, Victor Hugo, Franz Kafka, Gérard de Nerval, Jacques Prévert, Stendhal, and Jules Verne.

He resumed his literary career in 1968, in the wake of a relative cultural liberalization under Nicolae Ceauşescu's regime.

After the Romanian Revolution of 1989, he traveled abroad and gave public readings in France, Germany, Switzerland, and the Netherlands. In 1995, the German Academic Exchange Service appointed him scholar at the University of Berlin. Naum spent much of his final years at his retreat in Comana.

Works

 Drumeţul incendiar ("The Incendiary Traveler"; poems, illustrated by Victor Brauner), Bucharest, 1936 
 Vasco de Gama, (poem, illustrated by Jacques Hérold), Bucharest, 1940 
 Culoarul somnului, ("The Corridor of Sleep"; poems, illustrated by Victor Brauner), Bucharest, 1944 
 Medium (prose), Bucharest, 1945 
 Critica mizeriei ("Critique of Misery"; manifesto, co-written with Paul Păun and Virgil Teodorescu), Bucharest, 1945 
 Teribilul interzis ("The Terrible Forbidden"; drama, illustrated by Paul Păun), Bucharest, 1945 
 Spectrul longevităţii: 122 de cadavre ("The Specter of Longevity: 122 corpses"; drama, co-written with Virgil Teodorescu), Bucharest, 1946 
 Castelul Orbilor ("Castle of the Blind"; drama), Bucharest, 1946 
 L'infra-noir ("Infra-Black"; manifesto, co-written with Gherasim Luca, Paul Păun, Virgil Teodorescu, and Dolfi Trost), Bucharest, 1947 
 Éloge de Malombra – Cerne de l'amour absolu ("Malombra's Eulogy – Black Circle of Absolute Love"; manifesto, co-written with Gherasim Luca, Paul Păun, and Dolfi Trost), Bucharest, 1947
 Filonul, Bucharest, 1952 ("The Vein"; prose)
 Tabăra din munţi, Bucharest, 1953 ("The Camp in the Mountains"; prose)
 Aşa-i Sanda, Bucharest, 1956 ("So Is Sanda"; poems for children)
 Cartea cu Apolodor, Bucharest, 1959 ("The Book With Apolodor"; poems for children, illustrated by Jules Perahim)
 Poem despre tinereţea noastră, Bucharest, 1960 ("Poem About Our Youth"; poems, illustrated by Jules Perahim)
 Soarele calm, Bucharest, 1961 ("The Calm Sun"; poems, illustrated by Jules Perahim)
 A doua carte cu Apolodor, Bucharest, 1964 ("The Second Book With Apolodor"; poems for children, illustrated by Jules Perahim)
 Athanor (poems), Bucharest, 1968 
 Poetizaţi, poetizaţi... ("Poeticize, Poeticize..."; prose), Bucharest, 1970
 Copacul-animal ("The Animal-Tree"; poems), Bucharest, 1971 
 Tatăl meu obosit ("My Tired Father"; poems), Bucharest, 1972 
 Poeme alese ("Selected Poems"; poems), Bucharest, 1974
 Cărţile cu Apolodor ("The Apolodor Books", poems for children), Bucharest, 1975
 Descrierea turnului ("Description of the Tower"; poems), Bucharest, 1975 
 Insula. Ceasornicăria Taus. Poate Eleonora ("The Island. The Taus Clockmakers. Eleonora, Perhaps"; drama), Bucharest, 1979 
 Partea cealaltă ("The Other Side"; poems), Bucharest, 1980 
 Zenobia (novel), Bucharest, 1985
 Amedeu, cel mai cumsecade leu, Bucharest, 1988 ("Amedeu, The Most Honest Lion"; poems for children, illustrated by N. Nobilescu)
 Apolodor, un mic pinguin călător, Bucharest, 1988 ("Apolodor, A Small Travelling Penguin"; poems for children, illustrated by N. Nobilescu)
 Malul albastru ("The Blue Shore; prose), Bucharest, 1990 
 Faţa şi suprafaţa, urmat de Malul albastru ("Face and Surface, followed by The Blue Shore", poems), Bucharest, 1994 
 Focul negru ("Black Fire"; poems), Bucharest, 1995 
 Sora fântână ("Sister Fountain"; poems), Bucharest, 1995 
 Întrebătorul ("The Inquirer"; prose), Bucharest, 1996 
 Copacul-animal, urmat de Avantajul vertebrelor ("The Animal-Tree, followed by The Advantage of Vertebrae"), Cluj-Napoca, 2000 
 Ascet la baraca de tir ("Recluse in the Firing Range Shack"; poems), Bucharest, 2000
 Calea şearpelui ("The Way of the Snake"), Bucharest, 2002 (posthumous)

 Presence in English language anthologies 

 Testament – Anthology of Romanian Verse – American Edition - monolingual English edition - Daniel Ioniță (editor and principal translator), with Eva Foster, Daniel Reynaud and Rochelle Bews – Australian-Romanian Academy for Culture – 2017 – 
 Testament - 400 Years of Romanian Poetry - 400 de ani de poezie românească - bilingual edition - Daniel Ioniță (editor and principal translator) with Daniel Reynaud, Adriana Paul & Eva Foster - Editura Minerva, 2019 - 
 Romanian Poetry from its Origins to the Present - bilingual edition English/Romanian - Daniel Ioniță (editor and principal translator) with Daniel Reynaud, Adriana Paul and Eva Foster - Australian-Romanian Academy Publishing - 2020 -  ; 
References
 Walter Cummins, Shifting Borders: East European Poetries of the Eighties'', Fairleigh Dickinson University Press, Madison, 1993, p. 328  
 Gellu Naum site
 Naum's nomination for the Nobel Prize in Literature at the Romanian PEN Club site
  Gellu Naum at the Humanitas Bookstores' site
  Lyggia Naum's obituary at BBC Romanian.com

External links

  Gellu Naum, Azi-dimineaţă mersul tău
  Simona Sora, Pentru Gellu Naum

1915 births
2001 deaths
Writers from Bucharest
Academic staff of the University of Agronomic Sciences and Veterinary Medicine of Bucharest
Romanian children's writers
Romanian dramatists and playwrights
Romanian male poets
Romanian surrealist writers
Romanian translators
Romanian writers in French
French–Romanian translators
University of Paris alumni
Male dramatists and playwrights
20th-century Romanian poets
20th-century Romanian dramatists and playwrights
20th-century translators
20th-century Romanian male writers